Dunchurch is a large village and civil parish on the south-western outskirts of Rugby in Warwickshire, England, approximately  southwest of central Rugby. The civil parish, which also includes the nearby hamlet of Toft, had a population of 4,123 at the 2021 Census, a significant increase from 2,938 at the 2011 Census.

History
The earliest historical reference to Dunchurch was in the Domesday Book of 1086, which mentioned a settlement called Don Cerce.

The core of the village has been declared a conservation area because it has many buildings of historical interest. Some of the buildings date to the 15th century are timber-framed and still have traditional thatch roofs.

As Dunchurch was located at the crossroads of the coaching roads between London and Birmingham (now the A45 road) (classified as B4429 through the village) and Oxford and Leicester (now the A426 road), it was for centuries an important staging post. At one point, there were 27 coaching inns in Dunchurch to cater for travellers. Two of these still remain; the 'Dun Cow' and 'The Green Man'

Many notable people have stayed at Dunchurch. Most notably, in 1605 the Gunpowder Plotters stayed at the 'Lion Inn' (now a private residence called 'Guy Fawkes House') in Dunchurch awaiting news of Guy Fawkes's attempt to blow up the Houses of Parliament. If he had been successful they planned to kidnap the King's daughter Princess Elizabeth from nearby Coombe Abbey.

Other well known people who have stayed in the village include the young Queen Victoria (before she became Queen) and the Duke of Wellington. Robert Stephenson stayed in Dunchurch when supervising the construction of the Kilsby Tunnel during the building of the London and Birmingham Railway.

Dunchurch was for many centuries a more important settlement than nearby Rugby, that changed however with the coming of the railways in the 19th century; Rugby became a major railway centre and grew into a large town, this led to a dramatic decline in the coaching trade, and a decline in the importance of Dunchurch. However, from 1871 until 1964 the village was served by its own railway station about two miles from the village on the Rugby to Leamington Spa line.

The ancient parish of Dunchurch included the village itself, plus the nearby settlements of Cawston, Thurlaston, and Toft; The former two have become separate civil parishes. In the early 1930s part of the civil parish of Dunchurch was transferred to Rugby, and the part of the parish of Bilton which was not merged with Rugby was transferred to Dunchurch.

Education
There are three schools in the area: Dunchurch Infant and Nursery School (School Street), Dunchurch Boughton C of E Junior School (Dew Close) and Bilton Grange Preparatory School (Rugby Road).

Religion

There are three churches in the village: St Peter's (Church of England) in the centre, a Methodist chapel in Cawston Lane and a Baptist church on the outskirts of the village on the Coventry road.

St Peter's, dating from the 12th century, is a grade II* listed building.

Culture
The village has a sportsfield on Rugby Road donated to the village by Baron Waring in the 1920s. Currently Dunchurch & Bilton Cricket Club play in the summer months and Dunchurch Football Club play in the winter. Cricket has been played on the land since the 1800s. In 1999 Dunchurch Cricket Club merged with Bilton Cricket Club to form Dunchurch & Bilton Cricket Club. The changing rooms for the pitches are found adjacent to the village hall which was opened in 2003. There is a large main hall which can seat up to 160 people as well as a smaller sports room. Both have attached kitchens.

Other groups in the village include: Dunchurch Silver Band, District of Dunchurch Brass, Dunchurch Festival Group, Guides, Dunchurch Health Walks, Scouts, Mothers' Union, Photographic Club, St. Peter's Bell Ringers, Dunchurch Twinning Association, Dunchurch and Thurlaston Women's Institute, Working Men's Club.

Statue
In the centre of Dunchurch is a statue of Lord John Douglas-Montagu-Scott (1809–1860) a 19th-century landlord, Scottish M.P. and younger brother of the 5th Duke of Buccleuch. The statue is by the Victorian sculptor Joseph Durham A.R.A..

Since the 1970s an annual tradition has developed in the village for a group of pranksters to secretly dress up the statue as a cartoon or TV character overnight at the beginning of the Christmas holidays. The statue was dressed up as Queen Elizabeth II during her diamond jubilee weekend celebrations. In 2012 the statue was dressed up as an Olympian for the final leg of the Olympic torch relay sporting a headband and runners jersey. 2017 saw the statue become Paddington Bear, and 2018 The Grinch.

Notable residents
 William Tans'ur, (1706–1783) 18th-century hymnwriter 
 Katharine Merry, (born 1974) retired athlete, sports commentator  
 Alan Hodgkinson MBE, (1936–2015) footballer
 Ian Bell, (born 1982) cricketer

Twinning
In 1987, Dunchurch was twinned with the village of Ferrières-en-Brie in France.

Legacy
In 1877, the community of Newcombe in Ontario was renamed Dunchurch, Ontario by then postmaster George Kelcey after his birthplace in Warwickshire.

References

External links

Dunchurch Parish Council
Dunchurch Village Hall
Dunchurch Baptist Church

Villages in Warwickshire